The 1922 Isle of Man Tourist Trophy introduced a new race, within a race, for 250 cc motorcycles called the Lightweight TT, to be run concurrently with the already-established Junior 350 cc that took place on Tuesday 30 May, and Senior 500 cc race on Thursday 1 June.

The new third race was achieved by splitting the 250 cc machines away from, but run simultaneously with, the 350 cc machines that had previously been racing together in the up-to-350 cc engine-capacity limit. The win by Geoff S Davison on a Levis was the last TT win for a British two-stroke motorcycle.

Seventeen-year-old Stanley Woods attained fifth position on a Cotton with a time of 3hrs 50min 33secs, despite having to contend with a broken exhaust pipe and a pit-fire that set both man and machine ablaze.

Walter Brandish, placed second in the 500 cc race would become, in 1923, the first rider to have a bend on the course named after him (Brandish Corner). This was the last TT win by a side-valve machine.

Lightweight and Junior TT Race
It was held on Tuesday, May 30th, 1922 at 10:00 am over a distance of 188.75  miles, 5 laps of 37.75 miles each. Lightweight machines were limited of cylinder capacity not exceeding 250cc., they ran concurrently with Junior TT machines of 350cc. Riders started off at intervals of half-a-minute. All 32 entries started the race in Lightweight class and 14 finished. Out of 37 entries in Junior, 35 started and 16 finished.

Senior TT Race
It was held on Thursday, June 1st, 1922 at 10:00 am over a distance of 226.50  miles, 6 laps of 37.75 miles each. Senior TT machines were limited of cylinder capacity not exceeding 500cc. All 67 entries started the race, comprising 56 four-stroke Singles, 5 two-stroke Twins, 5 four-stroke Flat Twins and 1 four-stroke V Twin. Twenty-two riders finished the race.

References

External links
Detailed race results

1922 in British motorsport
1922
Isle